Henry Wilmshurst Sabine  (9 January 1865–13 August 1955) was a Welsh international footballer. 

Sabine was born at Oswestry, Shropshire, in January 1865 and educated at Oswestry School.

He played football with Oswestry. He was part of the Wales national football team, playing 1 match and scoring 1 goal on 12 March 1887 against Ireland at the 1886–87 British Home Championship.

Sabine also played cricket at club level for Oswestry and, between 1893 and 1895, at county level for Shropshire.

He died in August 1955 aged 90 at Harrogate, Yorkshire.

See also
 List of Wales international footballers (alphabetical)
 List of Wales international footballers born outside Wales

References

1865 births
1955 deaths
Sportspeople from Shropshire
Welsh footballers
Wales international footballers
Place of birth missing
Association footballers not categorized by position